National Farmers Union may refer to:

National Farmers Union (Canada)
National Farmers' Union of England and Wales
National Farmers Union of Fiji
National Farmers' Union of Scotland
National Farmers Union (United States)
Kenya National Farmers Union

See also
National Union of Algerian Farmers
National Farmers' Federation, Australia
Ulster Farmers' Union
Farmers Union Iced Coffee, Australia's largest selling flavoured milk